The 1998 Croatian Bol Ladies Open was a women's tennis tournament played on outdoor clay courts in Bol in Croatia that was part of Tier IV of the 1998 WTA Tour. It was the fifth edition of the tournament and was held from 27 April to 3 May 1998. Mirjana Lučić won the singles title.

Finals

Singles

 Mirjana Lučić defeated  Corina Morariu 6–2, 6–4
 It was Lučić's 3rd title of the year and the 4th of her career.

Doubles

 Laura Montalvo /  Paola Suárez defeated  Joannette Kruger /  Mirjana Lučić by walkover
 It was Montalvo's 1st title of the year and the 3rd of her career. It was Suárez's 5th title of the year and the 6th of her career.

See also
 1998 Croatia Open Umag

References

External links
 WTA tournament details

Croatian Bol Ladies Open
Croatian Bol Ladies Open
1998 in Croatian tennis